Connecticut's 22nd State Senate district elects one member of the Connecticut State Senate. It consists of the town of Trumbull as well as parts of Bridgeport and Monroe. It has been represented by Democrat Marilyn Moore since 2015.

Recent elections

2020

2018

2016

2014

2012

References

22